Stenachaenium is a genus of South American plants in the family Asteraceae.

 Species
 Stenachaenium adenanthum (Sch.Bip. ex Krasch.) Krasch. - Brazil (Paraná, Rio Grande do Sul, Santa Catarina, São Paulo)
 Stenachaenium campestre Baker - Brazil (Paraná, Rio Grande do Sul, Santa Catarina), Argentina (Misiones, Corrientes, Entre Ríos), Paraguay (Guairá), Uruguay (Cerro Largo, Montevideo, Colonia, San José, Soriano)
 Stenachaenium macrocephalum Benth. ex Benth. & Hook.f. - Brazil (Paraná, Rio Grande do Sul)
 Stenachaenium megapotamicum (Spreng.) Baker - Brazil (Rio Grande do Sul, Santa Catarina)
 Stenachaenium riedelii Baker - Brazil (Paraná, Rio Grande do Sul, Santa Catarina, São Paulo)

References

Inuleae
Flora of South America
Asteraceae genera